Anacostia Trails Heritage Area is one of the thirteen heritage area sites certified by the state of Maryland in 2001 and located in Northern Prince George's County, Maryland. The Anacostia Trails Heritage Area is administered by the Maryland Historical Trust with a mission to protect and promote the area's historical, artistic, cultural, and natural resources.

History 
The Anacostia Trails Heritage Area covers over 100 square miles of Northern Prince George's County. The Heritage Area is surrounded to the south by Montgomery County, to the west by Howard and Anne Arundel Counties, to the north by Washington, D.C., and to the east by a section of Bowie, Glenn Dale, and Cheverly. 

The Redevelopment Authority of Prince George's County handed over complete management of the Heritage Area to Anacostia Trails Heritage Area, Inc., a 501(c)3 organization, in 2010. Aaron Marcavitch served as Executive Director of the Heritage Area from 2010 to 2021. Meagan Baco has been named the Anacostia Trails Heritage Area's executive director as of April 2021. The organization has a voluntary management board of directors. The group bases its operations on the Approved Anacostia Trails Heritage Area Management Plan, created in September 2001 by the Prince George's County Planning Department and the Maryland-National Capital Park and Planning Commission.  The organization has received a Gold Seal of Transparency from GuideStar.

Anacostia Trails Heritage Area launched the Maryland Milestones tourism brand in 2012 to promote the region's historic firsts and distinctive moments. The Maryland Milestones initiative educates the general public and links the area's history, culture, and natural surroundings. Additionally, the Maryland Milestones brand highlights the significant role that transportation—including turnpikes, highways, parkways, aircraft, streetcars, telegraphs, and train travel—has played in trade, communication, and tourism in the area. The program's specific activities include maintaining the Annelie & Soren Ebbeler Maryland Milestones Heritage Center in Hyattsville, Maryland, hosting educational and recreational events, researching and updating interpretive signs and wayfinding, enhancing and promoting multi-modal trails, and more.

References

Charities based in Maryland
Protected areas of Prince George's County, Maryland